Lodovico Vedriani (1601-1670) was an Italian historian and priest from Modena. His writings spanned primarily the topics and annals of the Province of Modena, where lived and died on 9 February 1670, leaving much references to its historical background behind.

Work
, published in 1662 
Vite et elogii de' cardinali Modonesi, published in 1662
Dottori Modonesi di teologia, filosophia, legge canonica e civile, published in 1665
Historia dell' antichissima città di Modona., published in 1666

References

Citations

Further reading
Biblioteche del Comune di Modena

1601 births
1670 deaths
17th-century Italian historians
Italian art historians
Writers from the Province of Modena
Religious leaders from the Province of Modena